OPF Schools is a school system established by the Overseas Pakistanis Foundation for the welfare of Overseas Pakistanis.

The Overseas Pakistanis Foundation operates more than 24 schools in across Pakistan, offering preschool, primary, secondary and preparation for local SSC and the international GCE education. Most of its students opt to take the GCE O and AS/A Levels organized by the CIE of UCLES. 

In 2019, the school system started teaching Chinese language.

References

School systems in Pakistan
Overseas Pakistani organisations